Cape Jason (() is a cape located at Çaytepe / Çaka (officially Aziziye) villages, Perşembe (formerly Vona) district, Ordu Province, Turkey (the North East Shores of Turkey). Its name is derived from the Greek mythological hero Jason of the Argonauts.

History 
Cape Jason harkens back to ancient times when a temple of Jason stood at the edge of the sea, protecting the sailors of Black Sea's treacherous waters. A church later replaced the temple with a similar mission. It now sits in total solitude in an overgrown cornfield next to a lighthouse overlooking the roaring waves of the Pontus.

Cape Jason Natural and Archeological Site is on the borders of Çaytepe village in Perşembe county, on a small peninsula facing the sea. This area is currently a governmental environmental protection area, classified as second degree. The church still stands here, with the ruins of its garden wall. Parts of these ruins can be found all over the coast of the sea as well. Ancient ports and fish breeding pools can also still be seen today.

A church is located on Cape Jason. It was built in 1868 by Georgians and by some Greeks who were living in the region.

References
Özhan Öztürk. Black Sea: Encyclopedic Dictionary. 2 Volumes. Heyamola Publishing. Istanbul. 2005. .

External links
Northern Anatolia guide

Cape Jason
Greek Orthodox churches in Turkey
Headlands of Turkey
Landforms of Ordu Province
Jason